Cat and Dog (also known as Thieves and Robbers and Cats and Dogs) is a 1983 Italian crime comedy film directed by Bruno Corbucci.

Plot 
A playboy (Tomas Milian) who makes a living out of seducing women and stealing their jewellery accidentally ends up witnessing a Mafia murder. He must work together with the man who has been constantly trying to catch him, Lt. Alan Parker (Bud Spencer), in order to save his life.

Cast 
 Bud Spencer: Lt. Alan Parker
 Tomas Milian: Tony Roma (alias Antonio Rosario Archibald Pipino)
 Margherita Fumero: Deborah Smith
 Marc Lawrence: Salvatore Licuti
 Darcy Schean: Marianne 
 Billy Garrigues: Sgt. Haig
 Raymond Forchion: angry man

Release
The film premiered in Italy on February 11, 1983. An Italian voice cast dubbed the English-speaking original cast.

References

External links

1983 films
1980s crime comedy films
1980s buddy comedy films
1980s buddy cop films
Films directed by Bruno Corbucci
Films set in the United States
Italian buddy comedy films
Italian crime comedy films
1980s police comedy films
1983 comedy films
1980s Italian films